Pak Kyong-sun  (born 23 June 1985) is a North Korean women's international footballer who plays as a forward. She is a member of the North Korea women's national football team. She was part of the team at the 2003 FIFA Women's World Cup.

International goals

References

1985 births
Living people
North Korean women's footballers
North Korea women's international footballers
Place of birth missing (living people)
2003 FIFA Women's World Cup players
Women's association football forwards